The red-fronted rosefinch (Carpodacus puniceus) is a species of rosefinch in the finch family Fringillidae. It is sometimes placed in the monotypic genus Pyrrhospiza.
It is found in Afghanistan, Bhutan, China, India, Kazakhstan, Nepal, Pakistan, Russia, Tajikistan, and Turkmenistan.
Its natural habitat is montane tundra.

References

red-fronted rosefinch
Birds of Afghanistan
Birds of Bhutan
Birds of Central Asia
Birds of North India
Birds of Pakistan
Birds of Tibet
red-fronted rosefinch
red-fronted rosefinch
Taxonomy articles created by Polbot